Stibaromacha ratellina is a moth in the family Autostichidae. It was described by Turati in 1919. It is found in Lebanon.

References

Moths described in 1919
Stibaromacha